The Ballyhoura Way is a long-distance trail in Ireland. It is typically completed in four days. It is designated as a National Waymarked Trail by the National Trails Office of the Irish Sports Council and is managed by Ballyhoura Fáilte. The trail was opened in April 1994 by President Mary Robinson. 

From Ballyhea, the trail crosses the Ballyhoura Mountains to the village of Ballyorgan. The Way continues through the mountains to Galbally via Kilfinane and Ballylanders. From Galbally, it follows the Glen of Aherlow to Tipperary town before following the road to the end of the trail at Limerick Junction. 

The Ballyhoura Way forms one of the stages of the Beara-Breifne Way, a walking and cycling route under development, intended to run from the Beara Peninsula, County Cork to Breifne, County Leitrim, following the line of Donal Cam O'Sullivan Beare’s march in the aftermath of the Battle of Kinsale in 1602. It connects with the Multeen Way in Tipperary town.

References

Notes

Bibliography

External links
 Ballyhoura Way at IrishTrails.ie
 Ballyhoura Way at Ballyhoura Country

Long-distance trails in the Republic of Ireland
Geography of County Cork
Geography of County Tipperary
Geography of County Limerick
Tourist attractions in County Cork
Tourist attractions in County Tipperary
Tourist attractions in County Limerick